The Tungabhadra River is a river in India that starts and flows through the state of Karnataka during most of its course, before flowing along the border between Telangana, Andhra Pradesh and ultimately joining the Krishna River near Gundimalla village in Jogulamba Gadwal district of Telangana.

The river Tungabhadra derives its name from two streams viz., the Tunga, about 147 km (91.6 miles) long and the Bhadra, about 178 km (110.9 miles) long which rise in the Western Ghats. The river after the confluence of the two streams near Shimoga, runs for about 531 km (330 miles) till it joins the river Krishna at Sangamaleshwaram in Andhra Pradesh. It runs for 382 km (237 miles) in Karnataka, forms the boundary between Karnataka and Andhra Pradesh for 58 km (36 miles) and further runs for the next 91 km (57 miles) in Andhra Pradesh. The total catchment area of the river is 69,552 km2 (26,856 Sq miles) up to its confluence with Krishna and it is 28,177 km2 (10,880 Sq miles) up to Tungabhadra Dam. It is influenced chiefly by the South-West monsoon. It is a perennial river but the summer flows dwindle to as low as 2.83 to 1.42 cumec (100 to 50 cusec).

Course
The Tungabhadra River is formed by the confluence of the Tunga River and the Bhadra River at Koodli which flow down the eastern slope of the Western Ghats in the state of Karnataka. The two rivers originate in Mudigere Taluk of Chikmagalur District of Karnataka along with the Nethravathi (west-flowing river, joining the Arabian Sea near Mangalore), the Tunga and the Bhadra rise at Gangamoola, in Varaha Parvatha in the Western Ghats at an elevation of 1458 metres
(near Samse Village). According to a Hindu mythological legend, after killing the demon Hiranyaksha, Varaha Swamy (the third incarnation of Lord Vishnu) felt very tired. He took rest on the region now known as Varaha Parvatha. When He sat on that peak, sweat began flowing from his scalp. The sweat which flowed from the left side of his scalp became the Tunga river, and the sweat which flowed from his right side became Bhadra River. After emerging from the source, the Bhadra river flows through Kudremukh mountain region, Tarikere Taluk and the industrial city of Bhadravathi, while the Tunga river flows through Sringeri Taluk, Thirthahalli Taluk and Shimoga Taluk. More than 100 tributaries, streams, creeks, rivulets and the like contribute to the two rivers. Though both Tunga and Bhadra rivers start at same source (Gangamoola), they flow separately for some distance and then they later unite with each other at Koodali village. Hence from there, the composite name Tungabhadra was given. After confluence, The mighty Tungabhadra river flows through Honnali and Harihara taluks of Davangere district. Then it flows through Harapanahalli, Hoovina Hadagali, Hagaribommanahalli, Hospet and Siruguppa Taluks of Bellary district. In Siruguppa Taluk of Bellary district, it receives its tributary Vedavathi River. The river forms a natural boundary between Bellary and Koppal districts and then between Bellary and Raichur districts along its course. After entering Andhra Pradesh, it flows through Mantralaya and then through Kurnool. It receives its tributary Handri river near Kurnool. Then it joins the Krishna near Gundimalla Village of Jogulamba Gadwal district of Telangana state. The confluence of Tungabhadra and Krishna River is a holy pilgrimage site - The Sangameswaram Temple. The Jogulamba Temple( dedicated to Goddesses Devi ) is present near Alampur village. The Sangameswaram Temple (Dedicated to Lord Shiva ) is present in Kurnool District, Andhra Pradesh. The Varada flowing through Shimoga, Uttara Kannada and Haveri districts and Vedavathi in Chikkamagalur, Chitradurga and Bellary districts in Karnataka and the Handrail in Kurnool district of Andhra Pradesh are the main tributaries of the Tungabhadra. 
Many rivulets and streams join these tributaries. There is a popular saying in Kannada "Tunga Paana, Ganga Snana", which means "Drink Tunga River water, which is tasty & sweet, and bath in Ganga River, which is holy".

There are many holy places all along the rivers: primarily temples of Saiva cult on the banks of the Bhadra and all the cults on the banks of the Tunga. Hampi one of the important heritage locations being listed by UNESCO is on the banks of the Tunga Bhadra River. Nava Brindavan, an island where the final resting location of nine holy Madhva saints is in the midst of the Tunga Bhadra River. One can view the Tunga Bhadra River from famous Yantroddaraka Hanuman Temple at Hampi. Virupaksha Temple is also on the banks of the Tunga Bhadra River. The resting spot of Vasudendra Teertha is also on the banks of Tunga Bhadra River at Kenchangudda, Siruguppa. Manthralayam Sree Raghavendra Swamy Muth in Kurnool District and Alampur District, Jogulamba is the presiding deity at this holy place of Alampur- known as Dakshina Kashi, are the other important pilgrimage centres. There is a cluster of Nava Brahma temples constructed by the early Chalukyas.

An important feature of the river banks is the flood protection walls all along the rivers, constructed by Sri Krishna Devaraya between 1525 and 1527 AD. They are found wherever there is a possibility of land erosion during the floods. It starts at Sringeri and ends at Kurnool, just few kilometres from its mouth. They are stone constructions and still intact. Very large boulders of 3' x 4' x 5' are also used in its construction.

Piles of granite in varying shades of grey, ochre and pink dominate the landscape. The river has cut through weaker rocky substrata of the Hampi landscape and created a narrow gorge where granite hills confine the river in a deep ravine.

In this setting the ruins of Vijayanagara and Hampi, the seat of power of the Vijayanagar empire, overlook this holy river, creating a mythological landscape merging sacred traditions about a multitude of significant divinities.

The granite outcrops slowly disappear as the river flows south and the land opens into a long, broad plain ending at the rising slopes of the Sandur hills, rich in iron and manganese, beyond which is the town of Hosapete. The Tungabhadra Dam was constructed at Hosapete in the middle of the 20th century to harness the river water, aiding the growth of agriculture and industry in the region.

The Tungabhadra River then flows east, joining the Krishna in Telangana. From here the Krishna continues east to empty into the Bay of Bengal. The wedge of land that lies north of the Tungabhadra River, between the Tungabhadra and the Krishna, is known as the Raichur Doab.

Temples

 The Huligema Temple on the banks of the Tungabhadra River at Koppal district, Karnataka.
 The Markendeshwara Temple to Lord Shiva on the banks of the Tungabhadra river at Shivapur village, Koppal district, Karnataka.
 [[Shringeri|Sri Shringeri Sharadamba Temple] on the banks of the Tunga River in Chikmagalur district, Karnataka.
 Bidarallamma Temple to Goddess Renuka on the banks of the Tunga River in Gadag district, Mundaragi taluk Karnataka.
 Pampapati Temple in Kampli of Ballari district, Karnataka.
 Harihareshwara Temple on the banks of the Tungabhadra River at Harihara.
 Surrounding the modern town of Hampi are the ruins of Vijayanagara, the site of the powerful Vijayanagara Empire's capital city and now a World Heritage Site. The site includes the Vijayanagara temple complex ruins.
 The Moola Brindavana of Guru Raghavendra Swamy on the banks of the Tungabhadra river at Mantralayam, Kurnool district, Andhra Pradesh.
 Sri Dakshina Shirdi Sai Baba Temple to Shirdi Sai Baba, known as Dakshina Shirdi, on the banks of the Tungabhadra River at Kurnool, Kurnool district, Andhra Pradesh.
 Sri Jogulamba Temple to Goddess Parvathi, known as Dakshina Kashi, in Alampur about 25 km from Kurnool.
 The early Chalukyas built a cluster of temples on the left northern banks of the Tungabhadra river.
 The Nava Brahma Temples complex, one of the earliest models of temple architecture in India.
 The Sangameswaram Temple to Lord Shiva at the place where several holy rivers meet in Sangameswaram, Kurnool district, Andhra Pradesh. According to myth, the Pandavas of Mahabharata once came to Kurnool during their exile. They decided to install a Shiva Linga in this region after visiting Srisailam Mallikarjuna Temple. So, Dharmaraya (Yudhishtira) told his brother Bhima to bring a Shiva Linga from Kashi. Later, they consecrated the Linga at the confluence of the Krishna River and the Tungabhadra River along with 5 other tributaries. Hence, the Linga was named Sangameshwaram (Sangama means "where rivers meet"). Tunga Bhadra River Pushkara (festival) is held once in 12 years.

Recent dams
They are multipurpose dams (multipurpose dams help in generation of electricity, irrigation of land, prevention and control of floods, etc.) and irrigate lands in Shimoga, Chikkamagalur, Davanagere and Haveri.

Tungabhadra Dam (TB Dam), also considered a multipurpose dam, is across the river Tungabhadra. The dam is near the town of Hosapete in Karnataka. Its storage capacity is 135 Tmcft. Owing to siltation, the capacity has come down by about 30 tmcft. If there are seasonal and late rains, an estimated 235 tmcft is released. It is filled when water is let into the canals during the rainy season. The main architect of the dam was Thirumalai Iyengar, an engineer from Madras. A general-purpose hall was named after him. It has become a picnic or tourist spot over the years. TB Dam is near the heritage site Hampi. One of the major problems and concerns associated with TB Dam is that it has been undergoing a lot of siltation. Because of silt deposition in the dam, the storage capacity of the dam is coming down. Another major problem associated with TB Dam is increased pollution, resulting in decreasing fish population. This is seriously affecting fishermen, who are solely dependent on the river for their livelihood.

The Sunkesula Barrage near Kurnool city, a long barrage dam, was constructed across the Tungabhadra River around 1860 by the British engineer, hailed as Bhagiratha for Rayalaseema, Sir Arthur Cotton. Originally, it was intended to be used for navigation during the British Raj. The barrage was reconstructed by Kotla Vijayabhaskara Reddy as Tungabhadra Barrage, to provide irrigation for Kadapa district. As road and rail transportation increased, it is now supplying water for Kurnool and Kadapa districts, through the K. C. Canal. It impounds about 15 billion cuft of water and irrigates about  amount of land in Kurnool and Kadapa districts.

Problems

Industrial pollution has damaged the Tungabhadra River. Industry and mining on its banks in the Chikkamagaluru, Shimoga, Davangere, Haveri, Bellary, Koppal and Raichur districts of Karnataka and in the Kurnool district of Andhra Pradesh generate enormous amounts of effluents. Nearly 30 million liters of effluents are released into the Tunga from Shimoga each year." This is the contribution of just one city which, unlike Bhadravathi and Hospet, cannot boast of being an industrial city. As a result of the effluents, Tungabhadra is one of the most polluted rivers in the country.

Downriver from the industries, the water has turned dark brown and has a pungent odor. Tungabhadra river's pollution has affected 1 million people in the sub-basin as most villages use the river water for drinking, bathing, irrigating crops, fishing and livestock water, previously obtained through an ancient tank system. The livelihood of village fishermen has been harmed by regular fish kills that have exhausted Tungabhadra's fisheries.

Gallery

See also
List of dams and reservoirs in India
Tungabhadra Pushkaralu
Kishkindha
Sunkesula

References

External links

River Krishna
Physical landscape
Temples on the banks of Tungabhadra river

Dams in Karnataka
Rivers of Karnataka
Tributaries of the Krishna River
Rivers of Andhra Pradesh
Rivers of Telangana
Hampi
Places in the Ramayana
Geography of Bellary district
Geography of Shimoga district
Geography of Davanagere district
Geography of Kurnool district
Rivers of India